Michael Henrich (born March 4, 1980) is a Canadian former professional ice hockey player.  An NHL first-round draft pick of the Edmonton Oilers in 1998, Henrich played several years of professional hockey in North America before moving to professional hockey in Europe. Henrich is the first Jewish player to be selected in the first round of the NHL Entry Draft, and the only player taken in the first round of the 1998 NHL Entry Draft who did not play a regular season game in the National Hockey League.

Henrich's younger brother Adam Henrich was also a former professional hockey player for the Coventry Blaze.

Personal life
Henrich, who is Jewish, is from Thornhill, Ontario.

Playing career

Junior

Michael Henrich had a standout junior career with the Barrie Colts from 1996 to 2000 in the Ontario Hockey League. Barrie drafted him 5th overall in the 1996 Ontario Hockey League priority selection draft out of the Metro Toronto Hockey Leagues Midget Wexford Raiders.

In 1997 he was selected to the Ontario Hockey League all-star game, was voted MVP for Team Orr at the CHL/NHL Top Prospects Game and was voted by the Ontario Hockey League eastern conference coaches poll as best shot, hardest shot and most dangerous in the goal area.

In 1999–2000 he was an assistant captain of the Ontario Hockey League champion Barrie Colts. Barrie competed in the 2000 Memorial Cup in Halifax finishing runner-up.

1998 NHL Draft and North American Hockey

Prior to the 1998 NHL Entry Draft in Buffalo, New York,  Henrich was rated high by the NHL's Central Scouting Service who ranked him 3rd in their initial rankings amongst North American skaters, and by many sportswriters, including USA Today's Phil Colvin, who had him ranked as the third best prospect in the draft behind David Legwand and Vincent Lecavalier.

Henrich was ultimately selected 13th overall by the Edmonton Oilers. He was selected ahead of eight future NHL All-Stars including Simon Gagne (22nd overall), Scott Gomez (27th overall), Brad Richards (64th overall), and Pavel Datsyuk (171st overall). As a result of Henrich not playing a regular season NHL game, coupled with the large number of NHL all-stars drafted after him, many sportswriters and networks cite him as an example of a draft bust, with NHL.com columnist and hockey author John Kreiser even listing Henrich as one of Edmonton's all-time biggest draft disappointments alongside Jason Bonsignore and Scott Allison.

His professional career in North America lasted four seasons in which he played a total of 9 preseason games for the Edmonton Oilers scoring 1 goal and 1 assist. He also played 219 games for the Hamilton Bulldogs, Toronto Roadrunners and Hershey Bears of the American Hockey League and 6 games with the Tallahassee Tiger Sharks of the ECHL.

International

In 1996–97 Henrich competed for Team Ontario at the World U-17 Hockey Challenge in Red Deer, Alberta where Team Ontario won the gold medal. He was selected to the Canada men's national junior ice hockey team selection camp in 1998 and 1999. He represented Canada men's national ice hockey team at the Deutschland Cup in Hannover, Germany in 2002 where Canada finished as champion. In 2003, he represented Canada men's national ice hockey team at the Sweden Hockey Games in Stockholm, Sweden, where Canada placed third.

Henrich played hockey for Team Canada at the age of 17 at the 1997 Maccabiah Games in Israel where the team won a gold medal.

Europe

Henrich played in the HockeyAllsvenskan for Mora IK in 2002. He spent the 2004–05 NHL lockout with the Austrian National League team EK Zell am See and won the league championship.  In 2005, he played for the Füchse Duisburg of the DEL. In 2006, he played for the Grizzly Adams Wolfsburg of the 2nd Bundesliga and won the league championship. In 2008 he signed with Lega Italiana Hockey Ghiaccio club HC Asiago and won the league championship. He was a member of Dornbirner EC of the Erste Bank Eishockey Liga in 2012 and finished his career in 2014 with the Coventry Blaze of the Elite Ice Hockey League.

Career statistics

See also
List of select Jewish ice hockey players

References

External links

Michael Henrich Serie A Profile
 Oilers: Q&A with Michael Henrich

1980 births
Asiago Hockey 1935 players
Barrie Colts players
Canadian ice hockey right wingers
Jewish Canadian sportspeople
Coventry Blaze players
Dornbirn Bulldogs players
Edmonton Oilers draft picks
Grizzlys Wolfsburg players
Füchse Duisburg players
Hamilton Bulldogs (AHL) players
Hershey Bears players
Jewish ice hockey players
Living people
Maccabiah Games competitors by sport
Maccabiah Games competitors for Canada
Mora IK players
National Hockey League first-round draft picks
Tallahassee Tiger Sharks players
Toronto Roadrunners players
Competitors at the 1997 Maccabiah Games
Ice hockey people from Toronto
EK Zell am See players
Canadian expatriate ice hockey players in Germany
Canadian expatriate ice hockey players in Sweden